Angel John is a 2009 Indian Malayalam-language comedy-drama film co-written and directed by S. L. Puram Jayasurya, starring Mohanlal in the title role and Shanthanu Bhagyaraj (in his debut of Malayalam film), along with Jagathy Sreekumar, Nithya Menen, Vijayaraghavan, Lalu Alex, Salim Kumar and  Ambika in supporting roles. The music was composed by Ouseppachan.

Plot

Maradonna is an aimless youngster who likes to waste his time doing practically nothing other than fooling around. For him everything in life is just fun. He likes to take the easy way out and lacks focus in his life.

He is the only son of Joseph, a Banker and Mary, who dotes on him. The only person who has a soft corner for him is  Sofia who has a limp and is the daughter of a failed filmmaker, Kuruvilla.

Maradonna messes up his life by getting into company of friends and starting an internet café that fails and to recoup his losses and attracted by ‘easy money’ he gets into drugs. Soon he is conned and loses everything after pledging his house to a ‘blade’ moneylender.

On hearing the news his father is hospitalised and his mother finally loses faith in him. A shattered Maradonna decides to commit suicide by jumping from a lighthouse into the sea. As he is about to jump, he is held back by a divine force in the form of Angel John, who offers him a new lease on life.Angel John offers him two destinies, the first one is a life filled with good and bad events and the second one being a life with only happiness and he can live the way he want. Angel John also predicts that Maradonna will die aged 66 if he chooses the first offer. If he goes for the second he will die aged 22. The drunken Maradona chooses the second one. The Angel fulfills his desires but the same desires will not be fulfilled again. But as his desires gets fulfilled his death will also be near. Not thinking about the consequences he takes the easy way which starts with Rs.5 lakh to getting his house back from 'blade' moneylender.

When Kadar Moosa tries to win a world record by breathing underwater he gets caught in a fish net and dies without getting out. Angel, knowing of this incident, tells Maradonna but tells him he will not save Moosa. Maradonna jumps into the water to save Moosa followed by Angel and gives back his life again. Followed by the incident there was a colony get together in which Moosa shares his real intention in record winning was that he wanted his wife to come back and followed by Kuruvilla film which a producer accepted because the script Sofia wrote (script idea by Angel).

Everyone was happy but except Maradonna who is sad because he is going to die that day which was told by Angel. Maradonna asks Angel "what will he do if it was Angel in his position?". To which Angel replies "He will go to the God's dearest children (meaning handicapped children). When Maradonna goes there he sees the persons who conned him and many children, Maradonna gets into a fight with them and a twelve year old boy tries to stab a villain but by mistake Maradonna gets stabbed as Angel said.

When Angel and Maradonna (soul of Maradonna) goes to the roof Angel waits for God's grace and sends Maradonna (soul) back to his body. Angel explains to him why he is not taking Maradonna with him and departs. The next scene takes us to Maradonna, being an obedient boy who listens to his parents as Angel comes to the moneylender's house.

Cast
 Mohanlal as Angel John
 Shanthanu Bhagyaraj as Maradonna Joseph (voiceover by Sarath Das)
 Jagathy Sreekumar as Khadar Moosa
 Lalu Alex as Joseph
 Ambika as Mary Joseph
 Nithya Menen as Sophia (voiceover by Sangeetha Sivan)
 Vijayaraghavan as James Kuruvilla
 Baiju as Mathai / M.A. Thai, a Karate Master
 Salim Kumar as Rajan, a Moneylender
 Prem Kumar as Fireman
 Bijukuttan as Khadar Moosa Assistant
 Bineesh Bastin as Villain
Pradeep Chandran as Gangster

Soundtrack
The music was composed by Ouseppachan, with lyrics written by Ouseppachan, S. L. Puram Jayasurya, Manaf and Subhash Varma.

References

External links
  
 

2009 films
2000s Malayalam-language films
Films scored by Ouseppachan